Agrostis nebulosa is a species of flowering plant in the family Poaceae. It is referred to by the common name cloud grass, and is an ornamental plant native to Morocco, Portugal and Spain. This plant is often cultivated for its light delicate heads that are used dried in floristry.

References

External links

 
USDA Plants Profile: Aegilops longissima

Flora of Morocco
Flora of Portugal
Flora of Spain
Garden plants
nebulosa
Taxa named by Pierre Edmond Boissier
Taxa named by George François Reuter